Kristina Reynolds (born 18 February 1984) is a German field hockey player who competed in the 2008 Summer Olympics.

She is currently sponsored by Ritual Hockey.

References

External links
 

1984 births
Living people
German female field hockey players
Female field hockey goalkeepers
Olympic field hockey players of Germany
Field hockey players at the 2008 Summer Olympics
Field hockey players at the 2016 Summer Olympics
Olympic bronze medalists for Germany
Olympic medalists in field hockey
Medalists at the 2016 Summer Olympics
21st-century German women